Nasiruddin Bughra Khan was the Governor (1281–1287) and later an independent Sultan (1287–1291) of Bengal. He was the son of Delhi Sultan Ghiyasuddin Balban. Earlier Bughra Khan was the governor of Samana (Patiala) and Sanam (Sangrur).

History

Governor of Bengal
Bughra Khan assisted his father, Sultan Ghiyasuddin Balban, to crush the rebellion of the governor of Lakhnauti, Tughral Tughan Khan. Then Bughra was appointed the governor of Bengal. After the death of his eldest brother, Prince Muhammad, he was asked to take the throne of Delhi by Sultan Ghiyasuddin. But Bughra was indulged in his Bengal governorship and refused the offer. Sultan Ghiyasuddin instead nominated Kaikhasrau, son of Prince Muhammad.

Independent Sultan of Bengal
After the death of Ghiyasuddin in 1287, Bughra Khan declared independence of Bengal. Nijamuddin, the Prime Minister, appointed Nasiruddin Bughra Khan's son, Qaiqabad, as the Sultan of Delhi. But inefficient ruling of Qaiqabad spread anarchy in Delhi. Qaiqabad became a mere puppet in the hand of wazir Nijamuddin. Bughra Khan decided to bring an end to the anarchy in Delhi and advanced with a huge army towards Delhi. At the same time, Nijamuddin forced Qaiqabad to advance with a massive army to confront his father. The two armies met in the banks of Saryu river. But the father and the son reached an understanding instead of facing a bloody battle. Qaiqabad acknowledged Bughra Khan's independence from Delhi and also removed Najimuddin as his wazir. Bughra Khan returned to Lakhnauti.

Renouncing power
The death of Qaiqabad in 1289 shocked Bughra Khan. He left the power of Bengal for his other son, Rukunuddin Kaikaus in 1291.

See also
List of rulers of Bengal
History of Bengal
History of Bangladesh
History of India

References

13th-century Indian Muslims
13th-century Indian monarchs
Governors of Bengal